Shawn Parker Haviland (born November 10, 1985) is an American former professional baseball pitcher who is a pitching coordinator for the Boston Red Sox of Major League Baseball (MLB).

Playing career

Amateur baseball
Haviland attended Farmington High School (Connecticut). Clayton Haviland, Haviland’s grandfather, played for Cornell Big Red baseball, and Tim Haviland, his father, played for Connecticut Huskies baseball.

Haviland played college baseball for Harvard Crimson baseball. In 2006, Haviland was named Ivy League Pitcher of the Year. In 2005, Haviland helped Harvard win the Ivy League Baseball Championship Series, qualifying the team for the 2005 NCAA Division I baseball tournament. While in college, Haviland spent three summers in the Cape Cod Baseball League, pitching for the Wareham Gatemen and Yarmouth-Dennis Red Sox. In 2008, Haviland graduated from Harvard University with a degree in government. Haviland was selected in the 33rd round of the 2008 Major League Baseball draft by the Oakland Athletics.

Professional baseball
Haviland was assigned to A's affiliate team the Vancouver Canadians. In 2009, Haviland played for the Kane County Cougars. 

In 2010, he played for the Sacramento River Cats and the Stockton Ports. Haviland's pitching ranked in the top in the A's farm system during the 2010 Oakland Athletics season. Haviland had the most strikeouts of all A's minor leaguers with 169 strikeouts. Between 2011 and 2014, Haviland remained in the A's farm system, playing for the Midland RockHounds and the Stockton Ports.

In 2015, Haviland became a free agent and signed a contract with the Chicago White Sox where he played with the Charlotte Knights. Haviland was eventually traded to the Boston Red Sox and played for the Pawtucket Red Sox.

In 2016, Haviland played for the New Britain Bees. Later in the year, the Cleveland Indians signed Haviland to a contract and assigned him to the Columbus Clippers. 

In 2017, Haviland signed with the Boston Red Sox. He appeared in some spring training games for the Red Sox, including a start against the Tampa Bay Rays. Haviland also appeared in a game with United States national baseball team. Later, Haviland appeared as a starting pitcher for the Pawtucket Red Sox.

Post-playing career
Haviland spent the 2019 season as a pitching performance coach with the Red Sox, and was named a pitching coordinator in January 2020.

References

External links

Ports Player Spotlight: P Shawn Haviland
Ivy League to MLB: Advanced Metrics and Minor League Baseball by Shawn Haviland
Shawn Haviland on Twitter

1985 births
Living people
American expatriate baseball players in Canada
Baseball players from Connecticut
Charlotte Knights players
Columbus Clippers players
Harvard Crimson baseball players
Kane County Cougars players
Midland RockHounds players
New Britain Bees players
Pawtucket Red Sox players
People from Farmington, Connecticut
Phoenix Desert Dogs players
Sacramento River Cats players
Stockton Ports players
Vancouver Canadians players
Wareham Gatemen players
Yarmouth–Dennis Red Sox players